Christian II, Count of Oldenburg (died 1233) was a German nobleman.  He was the ruling Count of Oldenburg from 1209 until his death.

Life 
He was a son of Maurice I of Oldenburg (died 1211) and his wife Salome of Wickerode. 

After his father's death, he ruled jointly with his brother Otto I.  They ruled harmoniously and managed significantly to expand the rights and territory of Oldenburg in Frisia.

Christian II managed to end the sovereignty of the Archbishopric of Bremen over Oldenburg; in return, he assisted Bremen against the rebellious farmers in Stedingen.  He also fought many feuds against his liege lords, against his cousins, and against Hoya.

Marriage and issue 
He married Agnes, a daughter of Count Arnold of Altena-Isenburg with Mechtild of Holland and had two sons:
 Otto of Oldenburg (d. ), abbot in Bremen
 John I, Count of Oldenburg-Delmenhorst

See also 
 List of rulers of Oldenburg

References 
 Hans Friedl, Wolfgang Günther, Hilke Günther-Arndt, Heinrich Schmidt (eds.): Biographisches Handbuch zur Geschichte des Landes Oldenburg, Oldenburg, 1992,

External links 
 genealogie-mittelalter.de

Counts of Oldenburg
12th-century births
1233 deaths
Year of birth unknown